Marc Aurel Pickel (born 12 December 1971) is a German former yacht racer who competed in the 2000 Summer Olympics and in the 2008 Summer Olympics.

References

1971 births
Living people
German male sailors (sport)
Olympic sailors of Germany
Sailors at the 2000 Summer Olympics – Star
Sailors at the 2008 Summer Olympics – Star